Guranabad (also Romanized as Gūrānābād; also known as Kūrānābād) is a village in Beradust Rural District, Sumay-ye Beradust District, Urmia County, West Azerbaijan Province, Iran. At the 2006 census, its population was 101, in 17 families.

References 

Populated places in Urmia County